Charlie Hore (born 28 August 1976) is  a New Zealand rugby union player (fly half), he played for the Super 14 team Highlanders and played for Italian side Rugby Viadana. He also had a spell for Irish AIL Team Banbridge RFC in the late 1990s. He also played for Scottish side The Borders. He is the brother of former All Black Andrew Hore.

References
 Highlanders player profiles

1976 births
Living people
Highlanders (rugby union) players
Border Reivers players
Expatriate rugby union players in Scotland
New Zealand expatriate sportspeople in Scotland
Rugby union fly-halves